Musi Rawas Regency is a regency of South Sumatra Province, Indonesia. Prior to 2013, it covered an area of 12,134.57 km2 and had a population of 524,919 at the 2010 Census; however on 10 June 2013 the northern half of the regency was split off to form a separate North Musi Rawas Regency. Previous to 2001, the Regency had also included the city of Lubuklinggau, which was split off to form an independent city outside the regency. 

The area of the residual Regency from 2013 is 6,357.17 km2 and this had a population of 356,076 at the 2010 Census and 395,570 at the 2020 Census. The regency seat is the town of Muara Beliti Baru. During the Dutch East Indies area it was known as Rawas District. The area is named for the Musi River and its tributary the Rawas River.

History
In February 2010, Musi Rawas was subjected to serious flooding which submerged over 6,000 homes and affected thousands of hectares of land.

On April 29, 2013 there were a clash between local people from the northern part of Musi Rawas Regency (who blockaded the national road between Jambi and Palembang) and policemen who tried to lift the blockade. After 11 hours of negotiation had failed, four people were killed and six policemen were shot with traditional guns by protesters. People from northern Musi Rawas had called for a new regency to be split from the current Musi Rawas Regency; this new regency, called North Musi Rawas Regency (abbreviated often to Muratara Regency), was created in June 2013.

Administrative districts

As at 2010, the Musi Rawas Regency was subdivided into twenty-one districts (kecamatan), but in 2013 the northernmost seven districts (Rupit, Rawas Ulu, Nibung, Rawas Ilir, Karang Dapo, Karang Jaya, and Ulu Rawas) were split off to form a new North Musi Rawas Regency (Musi Rawas Utara). The remaining fourteen districts are listed below with their areas and their populations at the 2010 Census: and 2020 Census.

Gallery

See also
Napal Licin, an area in Rawas

References

Regencies of South Sumatra